The Bridge of Solidarity is a bridge across the Rhine between the boroughs of Rheinhausen and Hochfeld in the city of Duisburg.

Bridge history 

Construction on the bridge's predecessor, the Admiral-Graf-Spee-Brücke, was started on 12 January 1934 and the bridge was inaugurated on 22 May 1936 by then-minister Joseph Goebbels. Total building cost was 6.75 million Reichsmark. Like the Duisburg-Hochfeld Railway Bridge, the bridge was blown up by the retreating Wehrmacht on 4 March 1945. Only the floodplain bridge on the left bank of the Rhine remained.

In July 1945, a new bridge was already under construction and the bridge was opened to traffic on 3 July 1950. Following a recommendation of Krupp Stahlbau Rheinhausen, the new bridge was built as a Tied-arch bridge, the largest of its kind in Germany at the time with a span of 255.9 metres.
While the previous bridge had four lanes, the British Military government insisted on a three-lane bridge. The bridge was thoroughly renovated in the early 1990s, especially the old floodplain bridge parts. Since a few years, it is possible to adjust the direction of the lanes to current demand by a traffic light system.

Technical data 
 Type of construction: Tied-arch bridge
 Arch width: 255.91 m
 Pfeilhöhe 35.5 m
 Versteifungsträger: einwandig genietete Blechträger mit 4320 mm Stegblechhöhe
 Abstand der Versteifungsträger: 12.4 m
 Steghöhe des Hutquerschnitts: 1.7 m am Scheitel, 2.10 m am Kämpfer
 Carriageway width: 9 m (3 lanes at 3 m each)
 Cycle lane width: 1.1 m
 Footpath width: 1.8 m

Naming 
In 1987, Rheinhausen was present in the media due to the protests against the closing of the local steelworks. On 10 December 1987 the bridge was occupied by Krupp workers to protest against the closure of their plant. During the whole winter of 1987 and 1988 large demonstrations against the closing of the remaining smeltery followed. Apart from the Rhine bridge, protesters also occupied the Bundesautobahn 40 and blockaded the Krupp head offices at Villa Hügel in Essen. Pickets accompanied the conflicts for months. Therefore, Rheinhausen became a synonym for steel crisis. The Rheinhausen-Hochfeld bridge was renamed to Brücke der Solidarität by the protesting workers on 20 January 1988. On this day, 50,000 steel workers from more than 60 melteries marched to the bridge. The apprentices of the Krupp training workshop manufactured the new name plate overnight. Soon thereafter, the name was officially adapted by the city of Duisburg.

See also 
 List of bridges over the Rhine
 List of bridges in Germany

References 
 AufRuhr. Rheinhausen 1987/1997. Text Waltraud Bierwirth, Fotos Manfred Vollmer. Essen: Klartext-Verlag, 1997. .

External links 

Brücke der Solidarität  at route-industriekultur.ruhr
Picture of the bridge in 1962 (digit.wdr.de) 

Buildings and structures in Duisburg
Bridges over the Rhine
Bridges in North Rhine-Westphalia
Transport in Duisburg